The men's coxless four (M4-) competition at the 1976 Summer Olympics took place at the rowing basin on Notre Dame Island in Montreal, Quebec, Canada. It was held from 18 to 25 July and was won by the team from East Germany.

Background
The East German team was the undisputed favourite going into this event. Over the last few years, their rowers had won this class at almost all major regattas. After West Germany won the inaugural world championships in 1962, East Germany won all subsequent events in 1966, 1970, and 1974. Of the last four European Rowing Championships (the event was discontinued after 1973), they won gold in three of four of the events (1967, 1971, and 1973), and bronze in 1969. Other favourites included the Soviet Union and West Germany.

Previous M4- competitions

Results

Heats

Heat 1

Heat 2

Heat 3
The five teams in heat 3 of the elimination round eventually took the first five places in the A final.

Repechage
The Norwegian and Argentinian teams changed three seats. The teams from Canada, Romania, and Finland changed all four seats.

Semifinals

Heat 1
The East German team swapped seats 3 and 4. The teams from Great Britain and Bulgaria swapped all four seats.

Heat 2
The teams from the Soviet Union and Belgium changed all four seats. West Germany replaced Klaus Meyer with Klaus Roloff, and only the stroke remained in his seat. Italy changed three seats.

Finals

B final
The Bulgarian team changed three of the seats.

A final
For the second time, the Soviet Union changed all four seats. The New Zealand team changed all four seats. The Canadians changed three seats. As expected, East Germany won the gold medal; they had dominated all their races and won their qualifying heat 12 seconds faster than the other heats. The surprise winner of the silver medal was the team from Norway, who left the much more highly rated Soviet Union with bronze.

Notes

References

Volume 1 Part 1 (up to page 279)
Volume 1 Part 2 (from page 280)
Volume 2
Volume 3

Men's coxless four
Men's events at the 1976 Summer Olympics